Aeschlen bei Oberdiessbach (officially known as Aeschlen) was a municipality in the district of Konolfingen in the canton of Bern in Switzerland.  On 1 January 2010  the municipality of Aeschlen merged into the municipality of Oberdiessbach.

History
Aeschlen is first mentioned in 1303 as Eschlon.

Geography
Of this area, 60.2% is used for agricultural purposes, while 35.9% is forested. The rest of the land, (3.9%) is settled.

Demographics
, 1.6% of the population was made up of foreign nationals. Over the last 10 years the population has decreased at a rate of -7.3%. Most of the population speaks German  (97.5%), with Albanian being second most common ( 1.9%) and Serbo-Croatian being third ( 0.6%).

The age distribution of the population is children and teenagers (0–19 years old) make up 28.7% of the population, while adults (20–64 years old) make up 59.3% and seniors (over 64 years old) make up 12%. In Aeschlen about 64.4% of the population (between age 25-64) have completed either non-mandatory upper secondary education or additional higher education (either University or a Fachhochschule).

Aeschlen has an unemployment rate of 1.3%.  , there were 72 people employed in the primary economic sector and about 20 businesses involved in this sector.  13 people are employed in the secondary sector and there are 5 businesses in this sector.  30 people are employed in the tertiary sector, with 9 businesses in this sector.
The historical population is given in the following table:

References

External links
 

Former municipalities of the canton of Bern
Populated places disestablished in 2010